Fairy Tales From Saint Etienne (1995) is a compilation album by the British band Saint Etienne which was released only in Japan. It is a mix of album tracks, singles and B-sides.

Track listing

References

Saint Etienne (band) compilation albums
1995 compilation albums